The Addison B. Colvin House is a historic house located at 453-455 Glen Street in Glens Falls, Warren County, New York.

Description and history 
It was built about in 1890, and is a large, rambling, -story, "L"-shaped frame residence designed in the Queen Anne style. It features a one-story wraparound porch with Colonial Revival style design elements.

It was added to the National Register of Historic Places on September 29, 1984.

See also
 National Register of Historic Places listings in Warren County, New York

References

Houses on the National Register of Historic Places in New York (state)
Queen Anne architecture in New York (state)
Colonial Revival architecture in New York (state)
Houses completed in 1890
Houses in Warren County, New York
National Register of Historic Places in Warren County, New York